Saint-Aimé-du-Lac-des-Îles is a municipality in the Laurentides region of Quebec, Canada, part of the Antoine-Labelle Regional County Municipality.

The village itself is located just off Quebec Route 309 at the southern end of Lake of Islands (Lac des Îles).

History
In 1891, the parish of Saint-Aimé-du-Lac was founded. In 1907, the post office opened, named Lac-des-Îles after the nearby Lake of Islands (Lac des Îles).

In 1917, the municipality was formed as the United Township Municipality of Wabassee-Dudley-et-Bouthillier-Partie-Nord-Est, and renamed in 1942 to Dudley-et-Bouthillier-Partie-Nord-Est. In 1953, it became the Municipality of Saint-Aimé-du-Lac-des-Îles.

From January 8, 2003, to January 1, 2006, the municipality was amalgamated into the Town of Mont-Laurier.

Demographics

Private dwellings occupied by usual residents (2021): 375 (total dwellings: 481)

Mother tongue:
 English as first language: 0%
 French as first language: 100%
 English and French as first language: 0%
 Other as first language: 0%

See also
List of municipalities in Quebec

References

External links

Incorporated places in Laurentides
Municipalities in Quebec